This is a list of notable people born in, or associated with, the city of Braunschweig (English: Brunswick) in Germany.

Born in Braunschweig

A to D
 Kurt Ahrens Jr. (born 1940), racing driver
 Karl Andree (1808–1875), geographer
 Richard Andree (1835–1912), geographer
 Augustus William (1715–1781), Duke of Brunswick-Bevern
 Georg Anschütz (1886–1953), psychologist
 Augusta of Brunswick-Wolfenbüttel (1764–1788), Duchess of Brunswick-Wolfenbüttel</ref>
 Theodore Bachenheimer (1923–1944), soldier
 Joachim Bäse (born 1939), German international footballer
 Ewald Banse (1883–1953), geographer
 Cornelius Ludewich Bartels (died 1804), Governor-General of the Dutch Gold Coast
 Johann Christian Martin Bartels (1769–1836), mathematician
 Anton August Beck (1713–1787), engraver
 Bibiana Beglau (born 1971), actress
 Levin August, Count von Bennigsen (1745–1826), general
 Götz Bernau (born 1941), violinist
 Hans Berr (1890–1917), soldier
 Helmut Beumann (1912–1995), historian
 Ingo Beyer von Morgenstern (born 1955), engineer
 Klaus-Dieter Bieler (born 1949), Olympic athlete
 August Wilhelm Heinrich Blasius (1845–1912), ornithologist
 Rudolf Blasius (1842–1907), ornithologist
 Carl Ludwig Blume (1796–1862), botanist
 Oliver Blume (born 1968), manager
 Bettina Blumenberg (born 1962), field hockey player
 Jacob Bobart the Elder (1599–1680), botanist and first head gardener of Oxford Botanic Garden
 Wolfgang Bochow (born 1944), badminton player
 Otto Bock (born 1881), athlete
 Johann Joachim Christoph Bode (1731–1793), translator
 Friedrich Wilhelm Conrad Eduard Bornhardt (1864–1946), geologist
 Bosse (born 1980), rock musician
 Hartmut Bossel (born 1935), environmental scientist
 Hermann Bote (c. 1450–c. 1520), chronicler
 Detlef Bothe (born 1965), actor and film director
  (1842–1880), one of the founders of the Social Democratic Workers' Party of Germany, predecessor of the Social Democratic Party of Germany.
 Jack Brand (born 1953), Canadian international footballer
 Walter Bransen (1886–1941), composer
 Wolfgang Brase (born 1939), footballer
 Rudolf Maria Breithaupt (1873–1945), composer
 Ingrid Bruckert (born 1952), field hockey player
 Bernd Buchheister (born 1962), footballer
 Christian Heinrich Bünger (1782–1842), surgeon
 Johann Gottlieb Buhle (1763–1821), philosopher
 Axel Freiherr von dem Bussche-Streithorst (1919–1993), military officer and member of the German resistance.
 Petra Butler (born 1966), Academic
 Caroline of Brunswick (1768–1821), Queen consort of King George IV of the United Kingdom
 Lorenz S. Cederbaum (born 1946), physical chemist
 Charles I (1713–1780), Duke of Brunswick-Wolfenbüttel
 Charles II (1804–1873), Duke of Brunswick
 Alix von Cotta (1842–1931), promoter of women's education
 Stephan Dabbert (born 1958), agricultural economist
 Ewald Daub (1889–1946), cinematographer
 Simson Alexander David (1755–1813), writer
 Georg von der Decken (1836–1898), politician
 Richard Dedekind (1831–1916), mathematician
 Carl Ferdinand Degen (1766–1825), mathematician
 Edward Degener (1809–1890), politician
 Jaro Deppe (born 1948), footballer
 Dirk Dirksen (1937–2006), music promoter
  (1928–2016), swimmer
 DJ Pari (born 1975), musician
 Heinrich Wolfgang Ludwig Dohrn (1838–1913), zoologist
 Wolfgang Dramsch (born 1949), footballer
 Carl Georg Oscar Drude (1852–1933), botanist
 Paul Drude (1863–1906), physicist, developed the Drude model.
  (1741–1785), botanist
 Julius Düker (born 1996), footballer

E to H
 André Ehrenberg (born 1972), Olympic canoer
 Jochen H.H. Ehrich (born 1946), pediatric doctor
 Justin Eilers (born 1988), footballer
 Jusuf El-Domiaty (born 1990), basketball player
 Elisabeth Christine of Brunswick-Wolfenbüttel (1691–1750), Holy Roman Empress
 Lars Ellmerich (born 1961), footballer
 Christine Enghaus (1815–1910), actress
 Ernest Augustus of Hanover (1914–1987), Prince of Hanover
 Oskar Fehr (1871–1959),  ophthalmologist
 Frank E. Fesq (1840–1920), soldier
 Ferdinand Albert I (1636–1687), Duke of Brunswick-Lüneburg
 Karl Fiehler (1895–1969), politician
 Emil Fischer (1838–1914), opera singer
 Florian Floto (born 1988), Olympic archer
 Jacques Goldberg (1861–1934), musician, actor and theatre director.
 Moritz Ludwig Frankenheim (1801–1869),  physicist
 Frederick William, Duke of Brunswick-Wolfenbüttel (1771–1815), leader of the Black Brunswickers.
 Ernst Fritz Fürbringer (1900–1988),  actor
 Werner Fürbringer (1888–1982), U-boat commander
 Günter Gaus (1929–2004), journalist
 Carl Friedrich Gauss (1777–1855), mathematician
 Hans Friedrich Geitel (1855–1923), physicist
 Johan Georg Geitel (1683–1771), painter
 George William of Hanover (1915–2006), Prince of Hanover
  (c. 1415–1496), cleric and book collector
 Willy Giesemann (born 1937), German international footballer
 Werner Goeritz (1892–1958), general
 Moritz Göttel (born 1993), footballer
 Karl Heinrich Gräffe (1799–1873), mathematician
 Nico Granatowski (born 1991), footballer
 Johann Ludwig Christian Gravenhorst (1777–1857), entomologist
 Michael Green (born 1972), field hockey player
 Wolfgang Grobe (born 1956), footballer
 Otto Grotewohl (1894–1964), Prime minister of the German Democratic Republic
 Hansadutta Swami (born 1941), guru
 Otto Harder (1892–1956), German international footballer
 Robert Hartig (1839–1901), mycologist
 Albert Heine (1867–1949), actor
 Adolph Henke (1775–1843), physician
 Kurt Heyser (1894–1974), general
 Karl Gustav Himly (1772–1837), surgeon<
 Robert Homburg (1848–1912), politician
 Harry Hoppe (1894–1969), general
 Anton Ludwig Ernst Horn (1774–1848), physician
 Jannes Horn (born 1997), footballer
 August Howaldt (1809–1883), engineer
 Georg Ferdinand Howaldt (1802–1883), sculptor
 Hermann Heinrich Howaldt (1841–1891), sculptor
 Friedrich Huch (1873–1913), writer
 Ricarda Huch (1864–1947), historian and writer
 Rainer Hunold (born 1949), actor
 Conrad Friedrich Hurlebusch (1691–1765), composer

I to L
 Johann Karl Wilhelm Illiger (1775–1813), zoologist
  (born 1968), fashion designer
 Steffen Jürgens (born 1967), actor
 Henning Kagermann (born 1947), physicist
 Kai Karsten (born 1968), Olympic sprinter
 Katrin Kauschke (born 1971), field hockey player
 Herbert Kirchhoff (1911–1988), art director
 Sascha Kirschstein (born 1980), footballer
 Ernst August Friedrich Klingemann (1777–1831), writer
 Frederik Theodor Kloss (1802–1876), painter
 August Wilhelm Knoch (1742–1818), naturalist
 Robin Knoche (born 1992), footballer
 Gustav Knuth (1901–1987), actor
 Konrad Koch (1846–1911), football pioneer
 Özkan Koçtürk (born 1974), footballer
 Louis Köhler (1820–1886), composer
 Leo von König (1871–1944), painter
 Oliver Koletzki (born 1974), music producer
 Charles Konig (1774–1851), naturalist
 Joachim von Kortzfleisch (1890–1945), general
 Nina Kraft (born 1968), triathlete
 Uwe Krause (born 1955), footballer
 Gerard Krefft (1830–1881), zoologist
 Louis Krevel (1801–1876), painter
 Alfred Kubel (1909–1999), politician, Prime Minister of Lower Saxony
 Wolfgang Kubicki (born 1952), politician
 Christiane Kubrick (born 1932), actress and painter
 Kristina Kühnbaum-Schmidt (born 1964), German lutheran bishop
 Jens Kujawa (born 1965), basketball player
 Karl Lachmann (1793–1851), philologist
 Heike Lätzsch (born 1973), field hockey player
 August Lafontaine (1758–1831), author of sentimental didactic novels once immensely popular, born and brought up in the city
 Christophe Lambert (born 1985), judoka
 Gerhard Landmann (1904–1933), SS man
 Paul Lehmann (1884–1964), palaeographer
 Katharina Lehnert (born 1994), tennis player
 Rudolf Lindau (1888–1977), politician

M to P
 Thilo Maatsch (1900–1983), artist
 Alexander Madlung (born 1982), German international footballer
 Willy Maertens (1893–1967), actor
 Bertha von Marenholtz-Bülow (1810–1893), noblewoman and educator 
 Günter Mast (1927–2011), businessman
 Walter Mattern (1920–1974), SS-Hauptsturmführer
 Heike Matthiesen (born 1969), classical guitarist
 Heinz Mayr (born 1935), Olympic racewalker
 MC Rene (born 1976), rapper
 Rosine Elisabeth Menthe (1663–1701), wife of Rudolph Augustus, Duke of Brunswick-Wolfenbüttel
 Florian Meyer (born 1968), football referee
 Johann Heinrich Meyer (1812–1863), publisher
 Klaus Meyer (1937–2014), footballer
 Hugo Miehe (1875–1932), botanist
 Nils Mittmann (born 1979), basketball player
 Tomo Johannes in der Mühlen (born 1961), DJ and producer
 Gustav von der Mülbe (1831–1917), general
 Müller Brothers, a noted 19th-century string quartet composed of four brothers.
 Günther Müller-Stöckheim (1913–1943), U-boat commander
 Adolph Nehrkorn (1841–1916), ornithologist
 Christian Neidhart (born 1968), footballer and manager
 Marie Neurath (1898–1986), graphic designer
 Friedrich Bernhard Gottfried Nicolai (1793–1846), astronomer
 Walter Nicolai (1873–1947), spy
 Wilhelm Nienstädt (1784–1862), educator
 Carl Theodor Ottmer (1800–1843), architect
 Eva Pagels (born 1954), field hockey player
 Melanie Paschke (born 1970), Olympic sprinter
 Kurd Peters (1914–1957), soldier
 Marc Pfitzner (born 1984), footballer
 Jens Pieper (born 1968), Olympic archer
 Bernhard Plockhorst (1825–1907), painter
 Patrick Posipal (born 1988), footballer

Q to T
 Walter Ramme (born 1895), Olympic swimmer
 Erik Range (born 1977), YouTube personality
  (born 1952), rock drummer
 Tobias Rau (born 1981), German international footballer
 Gustav von Rauch (1774–1841), general
 Paul Rehkopf (1872–1949), actor
 Wilhelmine Reichard (1788–1848), balloonist
 Daniel Reiche (born 1988), footballer
 Kurt Reidemeister (1893–1971), mathematician
 Frank Rennicke (born 1964), singer and far-right political activist
 Arnold Rimpau (1856–1936), entrepreneur
 Johannes Runge (1878–1949), Olympic athlete
 Ernst Sagebiel (1892–1970), architect
 Michael Scheike (born 1963), footballer
 Heinz-Günter Scheil (born 1962), footballer
 Galka Scheyer (1889–1945), painter
 Dieter Schidor (1948–1987), actor
 Gudrun Scholz (born 1940), field hockey player
 Eberhard Schrader (1836–1908), orientalist
 Dennis Schröder (born 1993), NBA basketball player, currently with the Atlanta Hawks.
 Norbert Schultze (1911–2002), composer
 Christian Schwarzer (born 1969), handball player
 Edda Seippel (1919–1993), actress
 Emil Selenka (1842–1902), zoologist
 Paul Sievert (1895–1988), racewalker
 Hans Sommer (1837–1922), composer and mathematician
 Jan Spoelder (born 1973), footballer
 Louis Spohr (1784–1859), composer
 Alfred Staats (born 1891), Olympic gymnast
 Gustav Steinmann (1856–1929), geologist and paleontologist
 Bartholomaeus Stockmann (c. 1550–1609), composer
 Wenzel Storch (born 1961), film director and producer
 Stephanie Storp (born 1968), Olympic shot putter
 Delphin Strungk (c. 1600–1694), composer and organist
 Nicolaus Adam Strungk (1640–1700), composer and violinist
 Gustav Teichmüller (1832–1888), philosopher
 Mechthildis Thein (1888–1959), actress
 Ulrich Thein (1930–1995), actor
 Phillip Tietz (born 1997), footballer
 Louis Tronnier (1897–1952), general

U to Z
  (1836–1905), architect
 Lette Valeska (1885–1985), artist
 Conrad Varrentrapp (1844–1911), historian
 Hans Waldmann (1922–1945), fighter pilot
 Gerd Wedler (1929–2008), chemist
 Friedrich Georg Weitsch (1758–1828), painter
 Reinhard Wendemuth (born 1948), Olympic rower
 Franz Wenzler (1893–1942), film director
 Christian Rudolph Wilhelm Wiedemann (1770–1840), naturalist
 Arend Friedrich August Wiegmann (1802–1841), zoologist
 Rudolf Wilke (1873–1908), caricaturist
 William of Brunswick (1830–1884), Duke of Brunswick
 Christian Ludewig Theodor Winkelmann (1812–1875), piano maker
 Hermann Winkelmann (1849–1912), Heldentenor
 Frederick Albert Winsor (1763–1830), inventor
 Franz Winter (1861–1930), archaeologist
  (1843–1930), architect
 Nils Wogram (born 1972), musician
 Adolf Wolf (1899–1973), general
 Johann Zanger (1557–1607), legal scholar
 H. Dieter Zeh (born 1932), physicist
 Michael Zickerick (born 1948), diplomat
 Albrecht Zimmermann (1860–1931), botanist
 Johann Leopold Theodor Friedrich Zincken (1770–1856), entomologist

Lived in, or associated with, Braunschweig

A to D
 Leopold August Abel (1717–1794), violinist
 Franz Abt (1819–1885), composer
 Albert I (1236–1279), Duke of Brunswick-Lüneburg
 Albert of Prussia (1837–1906), Regent of Brunswick
 Friedrich Alpers (1901–1944), politician
 Anthony Ulrich (1633–1714), Duke of Brunswick-Wolfenbüttel
 Antoinette of Brunswick-Wolfenbüttel (1696–1762), Duchess of Brunswick-Wolfenbüttel
 Johann Arndt (1555–1621), theologian
  (c. 5th century), patron saint of Braunschweig
 Augusta of Great Britain (1737–1813), Duchess consort of Brunswick-Wolfenbüttel
 Wilhelm Friedemann Bach (1710–1784), composer
 Fritz Bauer (1903–1968), judge and prosecutor, who played an essential role in starting the Frankfurt Auschwitz trials.
 Johann Georg Beck (1676–1722), engraver
 Ernst Otto Beckmann (1853–1923), chemist and inventor of the Beckmann thermometer
 Oswald Berkhan (1834–1917), physician
 Willem Bilderdijk (1756–1831), poet
 Johann Heinrich Blasius (1809–1870), zoologist and founder of the Botanischer Garten der Technischen Universität Braunschweig.
 Hermann Blumenau (1819–1899), founder of Blumenau, Brazil.
 Wilhelm von Bode (1845–1929), art historian
 Friedrich von Bodenstedt (1819–1892), writer
 Caesar Rudolf Boettger (1888–1976), zoologist
 Rasmus Borowski (born 1974), composer and actor
 Maria Antonia Branconi (1746–1793), royal mistress of Charles William Ferdinand, Duke of Brunswick-Wolfenbüttel
 Heinrich Brandes (1803–1868), painter
 Adolf Breymann (1839–1878), sculptor
 Franz Ernst Brückmann (1697–1753), mineralogist
 Brun I (c. 975–c. 1010), Count of Brunswick
 Bruno (died 880), Duke of Saxony
 Victor von Bruns (1812–1883), surgeon
 Heinrich Büssing (1843–1929), industrialist
 Johannes Bugenhagen (1485–1558), theologian
 Joachim Heinrich Campe (1746–1818), educator and writer
 Charles William Ferdinand (1735–1806), Duke of Brunswick-Wolfenbüttel
 Emmanuelle Charpentier (born 1968), biochemist
 Martin Chemnitz (1522–1586), Lutheran theologian and reformer
 Lorenz Florenz Friedrich von Crell (1744–1816), chemist
 Walter Dexel (1890–1973), painter

E to J
 Johann Erdwin Christoph Ebermaier (1768–1825), physician
 Johann Arnold Ebert (1723–1795), writer
 Carl Friedrich Echtermeier (1845–1910), sculptor
 Egbert II (c. 1060–1090), Count of Brunswick and Margrave of Meissen
 Joachim Nicolas Eggert (1779–1813), composer
 Albert Eichhorn (1856–1926), theologian
 Frauke Eickhoff (born 1967), judoka
 Manfred Eigen (born 1927), Nobel laureate in chemistry
 Theodore Eisfeld (1816–1882), conductor
 Gottlieb Elster (1867–1917), sculptor
 Theodor Engelbrecht (1813–1892), pomologist
 Ernest Augustus (1887–1953), Duke of Brunswick
 Nadine Ernsting-Krienke (born 1974), field hockey player
 Johann Joachim Eschenburg (1743–1820), produced the first complete German translation of William Shakespeare's plays.
 Hansjörg Felmy (1931–2007), actor
 Ferdinand of Brunswick-Wolfenbüttel (1721–1792), field marshal
 Franz Wilhelm Ferling (1796–1874), oboist, composer, and clarinetist
 Alexander Fesca (1820–1849), composer
 Otto Finsch (1839–1917), explorer
 Christoph Bernhard Francke (c. 1660–1729), painter
 Frederick Augustus (1740–1805), Prince of Brunswick-Wolfenbüttel-Oels
 Friedrich Traugott Friedemann (1793–1853), educator
 Kurt Otto Friedrichs (1901–1983), mathematician
 Theodor Geiger (1891–1952),sociologist
 Friedrich Gerstäcker (1816–1872), writer
 Gertrude of Brunswick (c. 1060–1117), Margravine of Meissen
 Silvio Gesell (1862–1930), merchant
 Johann Glandorp (1501–1564), educator
 Gerhard Glogowski (born 1943), politician, Prime Minister of Lower Saxony
 Carl Heinrich Graun (1704–1759), composer
 Uwe Gronostay (1939–2008), composer
 Lord Frederick Spencer Hamilton (1856–1928), politician
 Johann Oswald Harms (1643–1708), painter and engraver
 Johann Adolph Hasse (1699–1783), composer
 Johann Christian Ludwig Hellwig (1743–1831), entomologist
 Ernst Ludwig Theodor Henke (1804–1872), theologian and historian
 Henry the Lion (1129–1195), Duke of Saxony and Bavaria
 Henry V (c. 1173–1227), Count Palatine of the Rhine
 Henry the Peaceful (1411–1473), Duke of Brunswick-Lüneburg
 August Hermann (1835–1906), physical education pioneer
 Levi Herzfeld (1810–1884), rabbi and historian
 Erik Hesselberg (1914–1972), writer and artist
 August Heinrich Hoffmann von Fallersleben (1798–1874), poet and author of Das Lied der Deutschen.
 Israel Jacobson (1768–1828), merchant and Jewish reformer.
 Heinrich Jasper (1875–1945), politician, Prime Minister of Brunswick
 Friedrich Jeckeln (1895–1946), SS and police leader
 Johann Friedrich Wilhelm Jerusalem (1709–1789), theologist
 John Albert of Mecklenburg (1857–1920), Regent of Brunswick
 Wolfgang Joop (born 1944), fashion designer
  (1885–1970), writer

K to R
 Reinhard Keiser (1674–1739), composer
 Inge Kilian (born 1935), Olympic high jumper
 Dietrich Klagges (1891–1971), politician
 Klaus von Klitzing (born 1943), Nobel laureate in physics
 Friedrich Ludwig Knapp (1814–1904), chemist
 Gottfried Michael Koenig (1926–2021), composer
 Peter Joseph Krahe (1758–1840), architect
 Nicolette Krebitz (born 1972), actress
 Johann Sigismund Kusser (1660–1727), composer
 Johann Anton Leisewitz (1752–1806), poet
 Ludwig Lemcke (1816–1884), philologist and literary historian
 Gotthold Ephraim Lessing (1729–1781), writer and philosopher
 Ephraim Moses Lilien (1874–1925), illustrator
 Henry Litolff (1818–1891), composer
 Louis Rudolph (1671–1735), Duke of Brunswick-Wolfenbüttel
 Friedrich Lübker (1811–1867), educator and philologist
 Rudi Lüttge (1922–2016), Olympic racewalker
 Matilda of England (1156–1189), Duchess of Saxony
 Marie of Baden (1782–1808), Duchess consort of Brunswick-Wolfenbüttel
 Erwin Otto Marx (1893–1980), engineer
 Jakob Mauvillon (1743–1794), historian and writer
 Jürgen Moll (1939–1968), footballer
 Benno Ohnesorg (1940–1967), university student killed by a policeman during a demonstration in West Berlin
 Otto IV of Brunswick (1175–1218), Holy Roman Emperor
 Philippine Charlotte of Prussia (1716–1801), Duchess consort of Brunswick-Wolfenbüttel
 Helga Pilarczyk (1926–2011), operatic soprano
 Agnes Pockels (1862–1935), chemist
 Werner Pöls (1926–1989), historian
 Karl Pohlig (1864–1928), conductor
 Wilhelm Raabe (1831–1910), writer
 Hans Reinowski (1900–1977), politician, publisher and writer
 Hermann Riedel (1847–1913), composer
 Friedrich Adolf Riedesel (1738–1800), commander during the American Revolutionary War
 Anna Roleffes (c. 1600–1663), one of the last women executed as a witch in Braunschweig.
 Rudolph Augustus (1627–1704), Duke of Brunswick-Wolfenbüttel
 Michael Ruetz (born 1940), photographer
 Nina Ruge (born 1956), TV presenter
 Francesco Carlo Rusca (1693–1769), painter

S to Z
 Hermann Schacht (1814–1864), pharmacist and botanist
 Ewald Schnug (born 1954), agricultural researcher, professor, Honorary-President of the International Scientific Center for Fertilizers
 Gerhard Schrader (1903–1990), chemist
 Katharina Marie Schubert (born 1977), actress
 Gustav Anton von Seckendorff (1775–1823), writer
 Hans-Christoph Seebohm (1903–1967), Vice-Chancellor of Germany
 Otto Sprengel (1852–1915), surgeon
 Henry E. (1797–1871) and C.F. Theodore Steinway (1825–1889), piano makers
 Stendhal (1783–1842), writer and politician
 Albert Sukop (1913–1993), German international footballer
 Alexandre Angélique de Talleyrand-Périgord (1736–1821), churchman
 Heinrich Emil Timerding (1873–1945), mathematician
 Fate Tola (born 1987), long-distance runner
 Ludger Tom Ring the Younger (1522–1584), painter
 Julius Tröger (1862–1942), chemist
 Kaspar Ulenberg (1549–1617), theologian
 August Ferdinand von Veltheim (1741–1801), mineralogist
 Victoria Louise of Prussia (1892–1980), Duchess of Brunswick
 Alfred Vierkandt (1867–1953), sociologist
 Friedrich Vieweg (1761–1835), publisher
  (1812–1878), optician
 Heinz Waaske (1924–1995), camera designer
 Mitchell Weiser (born 1994), footballer
 Ehm Welk (1884–1966), journalist
 George Westermann (1810–1879), publisher
 Arend Friedrich Wiegmann (1770–1853), pharmacist
 William V (1748–1806), Prince of Orange
 Olaf Willums (1886–1967), painter and printmaker
 Johannes Winkler (1897–1947), rocket pioneer
 Georg Wittig (1897–1987), Nobel laureate in chemistry
 Werner Zahn (1890–1971), bobsledder and World War I flying ace
 Luminita Zaituc (born 1968), Olympic long-distance runner
 Eberhard August Wilhelm von Zimmermann (1743–1815), geographer and zoologist
 Georg Heinrich Zincke (1692–1769), jurist

See also
 
 List of Braunschweig University of Technology people

References

Sources
 Reinhard Bein et al.: Braunschweiger Persönlichkeiten des 20. Jahrhunderts. 3 vols. DöringDruck, Braunschweig 2012–2015.

Further reading
 Luitgard Camerer, Manfred Garzmann, Wolf-Dieter Schuegraf (eds.): Braunschweiger Stadtlexikon. Joh. Heinr. Meyer Verlag, Braunschweig 1992, .
 Manfred Garzmann, Wolf-Dieter Schuegraf (eds.): Braunschweiger Stadtlexikon. Ergänzungsband. Joh. Heinr. Meyer Verlag, Braunschweig 1996, .

External links
 Persönlichkeiten at braunschweig.de. City of Braunschweig list of commemorative plaques for notable residents of the city.

Braunschweig
 
Braunschweig, People from